The 1969 North Dakota State Bison football team was an American football team that represented North Dakota State University as a member of the North Central Conference (NCC) during the 1969 NCAA College Division football season. In their fourth season under head coach Ron Erhardt, the team compiled a 10–0 record (6–0 against conference opponents) and won the conference championship. The team was also ranked No. 1 in the 1969 AP and UPI small college polls. The 1969 season was part of an unbeaten streak that lasted from the team's defeat in the 1967 Pecan Bowl until October 16, 1971.

Schedule

References

North Dakota State
North Dakota State Bison football seasons
NCAA Small College Football Champions
North Central Conference football champion seasons
College football undefeated seasons
North Dakota State Bison football